Four-cross (4X), also called mountain-cross, not to be confused with fourcross, is a relatively new style of mountain bike racing where four bikers race downhill on a prepared, BMX-like track, simply trying to get down first. These bikes are generally either full suspension with 140mm to 160mm of travel, or hardtails, and typically have relatively strong frames.  They run a chainguide on front and gears on the back.  They have slack head angles, short chainstays and low bottom brackets for good cornering and acceleration. In recent years the tracks raced on have been rougher and less like those used in BMX.

Four-cross was added to the UCI Mountain Bike World Cup and the UCI Mountain Bike & Trials World Championships in 2002, replacing dual slalom. It was removed from the World Cup following the 2011 series. A replacement world series, the 4X Pro Tour, was launched in 2012. The four-cross events were removed from the World Championship after the 2021 edition.

See also
Mountain Biking
Cross-country cycling
Freeride (mountain biking)
Dirt Jumping
Trials
Downhill

Notable riders
Dan Atherton
Anneke Beerten
Melissa Buhl
Eric Carter
Cédric Gracia
Jared Graves
Mike King
Jill Kintner
Brian Lopes
Michal Prokop
Roger Rinderknecht
Joost Wichman

External links
 International Cycling Union (Union Cycliste International)
 4X Pro Tour
 British Cycling - Get into Downhill and 4Cross
 BBC News Sport Academy 4Cross 
 About.com What Is Four Cross
Four-Cross Course Layout
 UCI World Cup Course

Mountain biking